Cameron Bruce (born 30 September 1979) is a former professional Australian rules footballer who played for the Melbourne Football Club and Hawthorn Football Club in the Australian Football League (AFL). He is currently serving as an assistant coach for the Brisbane Lions. During his AFL career, he was known for his aerobic capacity and neat kicking skills.

Early life

He attended Melbourne High School and played for Melbourne High School Old Boys following his schooling.

Playing career

Melbourne Football Club
It was from MHSOB that he was drafted in 1999, at the relatively old age of 20. He was Melbourne's last selection in that year's draft, taken as the club's sixth pick, and 64th overall, behind team-mates Brad Green, Paul Wheatley and Matthew Whelan. At 20, and after one year in Melbourne's Junior Development Squad, he made his debut for the Demon senior side against Richmond in Round 1 of the 2000 season, kicking a goal with his first kick in AFL football. He played in Melbourne's impressive run to the Grand Final, but had to withdraw from the final match of the season due to injury. Given the number 32 guernsey, he quickly adapted to AFL football, receiving a Rising Star nomination in his debut season, and finishing runner-up to David Neitz in the club's best-and-fairest in 2002. He was a member of the International Rules sides of 2002 and 2004.

Developing his game
Bruce developed his game as a midfielder, but from 2005 he has been used in attack, across half-back and also as a tagger – the latter role seen notably through his tagging of high-profile players such as James Hird, Chris Judd, Adam Goodes and Nathan Buckley. Because of his ability to adapt to new positions and roles within the side, versatility is often highlighted as one of his main strengths, and he has been regarded as the most versatile player in the league at various stages throughout his career. He enjoyed a solid run of form in 2004, which he managed 34 goals for the year, including a seven-goal haul against Carlton in round six. He carried the form through to the 2005 season – enjoying a particularly fruitful period early in the season – before suffering a serious shoulder injury sustained from a heavy tackle which ended his season prematurely.

Established player
In 2006, he played a pivotal role in Melbourne's eight-game winning run, which came on the back of losing their first three matches of the season.  He kicked the winning goal against Sydney in round 4 and received 10 Brownlow votes throughout the season, his most in a season to date. He finished second in the club's best-and-fairest and had one of his more consistent seasons – he was one of only two players to average more than 22 disposals and kick more than 20 goals for the season. (The other was Chris Judd.) The 2007 season was hugely disappointing for Melbourne, where they were unable to convert narrow losses into wins and being outclassed on other occasions. Bruce celebrated his 150-game milestone in Round 4, and averaged 24 possessions for the season. He achieved a career-high of 35 possessions against the Kangaroos in Round 9, but his goal tally was well down on previous seasons, kicking just nine majors for the season. His preparations for the 2008 season were hampered by injuries suffered in pre-season, but he was selected in Round 1 and played in the first fourteen matches of the season for Melbourne. New Demons coach Dean Bailey used Bruce chiefly in defence in the early stages of the season, where he picked up Brad Johnson and Cameron Mooney among others. Bailey handed Bruce a more attacking role during the middle of the season, generally playing either off half-back as a rebounding defender, or on the wing. Bruce kicked two goals in all three of Melbourne's wins for the season. He played in all 22 of Melbourne's matches for the season (the only Demon player to do so) and averaged more than 24 disposals per game. He won Melbourne's best-and-fairest for the season, polling 75 votes – 15 more than second-place Brock McLean.

Melbourne leader
Following the retirement of David Neitz in 2008, Bruce was named co-captain of the team alongside James McDonald for the remainder of the season. This came on the back of his role in the leadership group in 2007. McDonald was named as permanent captain for 2009, with Bruce as vice-captain. Bruce resumed his place in the midfield for 2009 and rotated equally between the forward- and back-flanks. He recorded 30 disposals and nine marks against Collingwood in Round 2. He kicked the 200th goal of his career in a 22-point loss to Hawthorn in Round 9. Bruce played his 200th game in round 16, 2009.

Hawthorn
In November 2010, it was reported that Bruce had been training with the Hawthorn Football Club, after being given permission by the AFL. Bruce was subsequently drafted by the Hawks with the fifth selection in the pre-season draft. A few hours after he had been drafted by the Hawks, Bruce had revealed on SEN, a Melbourne-based sports-talkback radio station, that he had already been handed the number 17 guernsey, made famous by Hawthorn legend, Michael Tuck.

Midway through the 2012 season, Bruce announced his retirement from football, citing a persistent back injury as the cause. He retired having played 234 AFL games, including 10 with the Hawks, and kicked 211 goals.

Coaching career

Hawthorn Football Club
Bruce was appointed as an assistant coach in the role of development coach with the Hawthorn Football Club in 2013 under senior coach Alastair Clarkson. After impressing in his role as a development coach, he was promoted to a senior assistant coach with the Hawks in late 2013. On 22 August 2017, it was announced that Bruce would leave Hawthorn at the end of the 2017 season to become a senior assistant coach at Carlton.

Carlton Football Club
At the end of the 2017 season, Bruce joined the Carlton Football Club as senior assistant coach under senior coach Brendon Bolton. At the end of the 2021 season, Bruce left the Carlton Football Club due to a clean-out at the club, after an extensive review of the club's football operations.

Brisbane Lions
On 20 September 2021, it was announced that Bruce had joined Brisbane Lions as an assistant coach in the position of midfield coach under senior coach Chris Fagan.

Statistics

|- style=background:#EAEAEA
| 2000 ||  || 32
| 19 || 22 || 13 || 110 || 78 || 188 || 54 || 14 || 1.2 || 0.7 || 5.8 || 4.1 || 9.9 || 2.8 || 0.7 || 0
|-
| 2001 ||  || 32
| 22 || 31 || 18 || 148 || 105 || 253 || 81 || 34 || 1.4 || 0.8 || 6.7 || 4.8 || 11.5 || 3.7 || 1.5 || 0
|- style=background:#EAEAEA
| 2002 ||  || 32
| 24 || 20 || 11 || 216 || 152 || 368 || 121 || 47 || 0.8 || 0.5 || 9.0 || 6.3 || 15.3 || 5.0 || 2.0 || 0
|-
| 2003 ||  || 32
| 20 || 25 || 18 || 205 || 137 || 342 || 101 || 34 || 1.3 || 0.9 || 10.3 || 6.9 || 17.1 || 5.1 || 1.7 || 8
|- style=background:#EAEAEA
| 2004 ||  || 32
| 22 || 34 || 23 || 229 || 199 || 428 || 99 || 81 || 1.5 || 1.0 || 10.4 || 9.0 || 19.5 || 4.5 || 3.7 || 9
|-
| 2005 ||  || 32
| 15 || 20 || 14 || 167 || 93 || 260 || 73 || 27 || 1.3 || 0.9 || 11.1 || 6.2 || 17.3 || 4.9 || 1.8 || 8
|- style=background:#EAEAEA
| 2006 ||  || 32
| 24 || 21 || 19 || 303 || 234 || 537 || 175 || 100 || 0.9 || 0.8 || 12.6 || 9.8 || 22.4 || 7.3 || 4.2 || 10
|-
| 2007 ||  || 32
| 16 || 9 || 14 || 194 || 183 || 377 || 96 || 66 || 0.6 || 0.9 || 12.1 || 11.4 || 23.6 || 6.0 || 4.1 || 5
|- style=background:#EAEAEA
| 2008 ||  || 32
| 22 || 13 || 12 || 244 || 287 || 531 || 147 || 77 || 0.6 || 0.5 || 11.1 || 13.0 || 24.1 || 6.7 || 3.5 || 2
|-
| 2009 ||  || 32
| 19 || 9 || 8 || 213 || 266 || 479 || 114 || 58 || 0.5 || 0.4 || 11.2 || 14.0 || 25.2 || 6.0 || 3.1 || 0
|- style=background:#EAEAEA
| 2010 ||  || 32
| 21 || 6 || 7 || 210 || 304 || 514 || 116 || 73 || 0.3 || 0.3 || 10.0 || 14.5 || 24.5 || 5.5 || 3.5 || 4
|-
| 2011 ||  || 17
| 9 || 1 || 4 || 67 || 95 || 162 || 50 || 28 || 0.1 || 0.4 || 7.4 || 10.6 || 18.0 || 5.6 || 3.1 || 0
|- style=background:#EAEAEA
| 2012 ||  || 17
| 1 || 0 || 0 || 4 || 4 || 8 || 2 || 0 || 0.0 || 0.0 || 4.0 || 4.0 || 8.0 || 2.0 || 0.0 || 0
|- class="sortbottom"
! colspan=3| Career
! 234 !! 211 !! 161 !! 2310 !! 2137 !! 4447 !! 1229 !! 639 !! 0.9 !! 0.7 !! 9.9 !! 9.1 !! 19.0 !! 5.3 !! 2.7 !! 46
|}

Honours and achievements
Team
 Minor premiership: 2012

Individual
 Keith 'Bluey' Truscott Medal: 2008
 Melbourne captain: 2008
 Australian international rules football team: 2002, 2004
 AFL Rising Star nominee: 2000

References

External links

DemonWiki profile

1979 births
Living people
Melbourne Football Club players
Keith 'Bluey' Truscott Trophy winners
People educated at Melbourne High School
Australian rules footballers from Victoria (Australia)
Melbourne High School Old Boys Football Club players
Hawthorn Football Club players
Box Hill Football Club players
Australia international rules football team players